The Garden of Sinners, known in Japan as  sometimes referred to as , is a Japanese light novel series, written by Kinoko Nasu and illustrated by Takashi Takeuchi. Originally released as a series of chapters released independently online or at Comiket between October 1998 and August 1999, the chapters were later republished by Kodansha into two volumes in 2004, and again in three volumes between 2007 and 2008.

Ufotable produced a series of seven anime films based on the series between 2007 and 2009 and also produced an original video animation episode in 2011. A final anime film was produced and released in 2013. A manga adaptation illustrated by Sphere Tenku started serialization in September 2010 in Seikaisha's online magazine Saizensen.

Plot

Story and Settings
It also chronicles Mikiya Kokutou's unwavering efforts to get closer to her when they were still high school students and their adventures later on in dealing with supernatural cases as investigators for Touko Aozaki's detective agency, Garan no Dou.

This is set in an alternate universe to Tsukihime and Fate/stay night; in which it serves as the prototype for both series as well as introducing many of the concepts prevalent within the latter two. In particular the main protagonist, Shiki Ryougi, possesses similar abilities as Tsukihimes protagonist, Shiki Tohno. Aoko Aozaki's sister, Touko Aozaki, is also featured and briefly mentioned in Tsukihime.

As one of Kinoko Nasu's earliest works, it introduces some of the most fundamental concepts in the universe of Type-Moon's works, including souls, the Akashic Record/Root, Counter Force, Magic, Magecraft, and Mystic Eyes.

Both the light novel and the films are depicted in anachronical order with each chapter/film serving as part of one collective narrative.

Themes
The series deals with the paranormal and tackles mature topics such as suicide, rape, patricide, incest and murder. Its lore and story draws inspiration from various religious philosophies and psychological concepts such as multiple personalities; the Anima and animus; the nature of sin; life, death and reincarnation; and the Paradoxical nature of the Taiji.

Main characters

 is a teenaged girl, who possesses the "Mystic Eyes of Death Perception".

 is Shiki's love interest and later husband who, two years previously, made a promise to attend college with Shiki.

 is Mikiya's younger sister who is in love with him. She becomes an apprentice of Tōko due to her rivalry against Shiki and is talented in ignition sorcery.

, appearing as a puppet maker, Touko is actually a powerful sorceress.

Media

Light novels
The Garden of Sinners originated in October 1998 as a series of five chapters released online on Nasu and Takeuchi's dōjin-based website, with its final two chapters being released at Comiket 56 in August 1999. Nasu and Takeuchi later formed Type-Moon, and in 2001, featured the first four chapters of the book on their 2001 Tsukihime bonus disk, Tsukihime Plus-Disk, which saw The Garden of Sinners gain significant popularity, leading it to be released as a dōjinshi publication at Comiket 61 on December 30, 2001. On August 6, 2004, Kodansha released the series as a commercial publication, which enjoyed immense popularity, with 5,000 limited-edition versions of the novel being sold almost immediately upon release. Both editions of The Garden of Sinners altogether sold more than 700,000 copies. A chapter, Final Record, was distributed as a bonus for viewers of the Future Gospel film.

Del Rey Manga announced the English publication of the light novel series. This was confirmed in the first volume of Del Rey's Faust released on August 19, 2008. However, Del Rey became defunct before it could happen.

Short stories

Manga
A manga adaptation of the novel series written and illustrated by Tenkuu Sphere is currently being serialized in Saizensen web magazine since September 15, 2010, The original writer Kinoko Nasu and artist Takashi Takeuchi supervised the work. The tankobon volumes are published by Kodansha.

Drama CD
On August 9, 2002, a drama CD written by  based on the Overlooking View chapter was released.

Anime films
The series was adapted into an anime film series, divided into seven chapters, which were animated by the studio ufotable. The films are released in achronological order. The first chapter, titled , premiered across Japanese theaters on December 1, 2007, with the second, third, fourth, fifth, sixth, and seventh chapters,  being released soon after on December 29, 2007, followed by January 26, 2008, May 24, 2008, August 16, 2008, December 20, 2008, and August 8, 2009, respectively. A compilation film of the first six films with some new footage was released on March 14, 2009, in preparation for the release of the final seventh film. In connection with the film's release, the novels were once again reprinted, as three volumes with new illustrations. A North American premiere of the fifth chapter was held on May 22, 2009, at the Anime Boston convention.

The series was released on Blu-ray with a new chapter, Gekijō-ban Kara no Kyōkai Shūshō: Kara no Kyōkai, in Japanese with English subtitles. A DVD of the said chapter was released on February 2, 2011. Aniplex of America released the imported Blu-ray box set on February 8, 2011. The box was immediately sold out and has not been reissued since. However, the individual films were available for rent on the PlayStation Network until mid-2012. A new limited edition DVD boxset was released in late 2012. Likewise, Madman Entertainment released a limited edition DVD boxset in October 2013.

3D conversion of The Garden of Sinners  first movie called  was released in July 2013.

A TV series conversion of the seven films was broadcast From July to September 2013. This reconstructed the story in chronological order rather than the order of release and did not include Chapter 5, Paradox Spiral, and Chapter 6, Oblivion Recording.

An eighth film, was released in September 2013 and had grossed US$1,710,413 by October 20. Aniplex of America has released Future Gospel (now subtitled -recalled out summer-) and Future Gospel – Extra Chorus on Blu-ray in late April 2015. Aniplex has also released the Japanese import of all 7 Kara no Kyoukai movie on Blu-ray in November 2015.

Each of the theme songs to the film series are performed by Kalafina, a project formed by Yuki Kajiura. Outside of the ones for Future Gospel, they were found on their album Seventh Heaven.

The Final Record chapter currently has no plans to be animated.

Releases
 The Garden of Sinners: Overlooking View (2007 (original) / 2013 (3D remake)
 The Garden of Sinners: A Study in Murder – Part 1 (2007)
 The Garden of Sinners: Remaining Sense of Pain (2008)
 The Garden of Sinners: The Hollow Shrine (2008)
 The Garden of Sinners: Paradox Spiral (2008)
 The Garden of Sinners: Oblivion Recording (2008)
 The Garden of Sinners: A Study in Murder – Part 2 (2009)
 The Garden of Sinners: Future Gospel (2013)

Other films
{| class="wikitable sortable"
|-
! #
! Title
! Director
! Original release date
|-

|}

Theme songs

References

External links
  
 Manga official website 
 Official Aniplex USA website
 

1998 Japanese novels
2007 anime films
2008 anime films
2009 anime films
2011 anime OVAs
Anime and manga based on light novels
Anime composed by Yuki Kajiura
Aniplex
Novels about magic
Dark fantasy anime and manga
Psychological anime and manga
Philosophical anime and manga
Incest in anime and manga
Kara no Kyōkai
Light novels
Light novels first published online
Japanese novels adapted into films
Type-Moon
Ufotable
2000s Japanese-language films
2010s Japanese-language films